Vincent Bilodeau (born August 11, 1951) is a French Canadian actor and comedian from Quebec.

Career
Vincent Bilodeau appeared in many feature films including A Sunday in Kigali in 2006.

Private life
He is the brother of Yvon Bilodeau and the uncle of Guillaume Bilodeau.

Filmography

1974: La Petite Patrie (TV series): Clément Germain
1985: Manon (TV series): Dr. Stéphane Joly
1991: Lance et compte: Tous pour un (TV): Jean-Marie Monette
1992: Dominique (TV series): Pierre-Luc
1993: Au nom du père et du fils (TV series): Honoré Villeneuve
1999: Radio (TV series)
2001: Soft Shell Man (Un crabe dans la tête): Gallery director
2002: Chaos and Desire (La Turbulence des fluides): Simon Deslandes
2002: The Negro (Le nèg'): Garry Racine
2003: L'Auberge du chien noir (TV series): Richard St-Maurice
2003: 20h17 rue Darling: Lt. Geoffrion
2003: Gaz Bar Blues: Mononc' Boivin
2004: Les Bougon (TV series): Chabot
2004: Temps dur (TV series): Donald Sigouin
2004: Les Ménés: Michel Mouky
2005: René Lévesque: Georges-Émile Lapalme
2006: A Sunday in Kigali (Un dimanche à Kigali)
2007: Bob Gratton : Ma Vie, My Life (TV series): Rodger Gratton
2009: A Happy Man (Le Bonheur de Pierre)
2010: Stay with Me (Reste avec moi): Florian
2018: Discussions avec mes parents (TV series): Jean-Pierre Morency
2019: We Are Gold (Nous sommes Gold)

References

External links

1951 births
Canadian male film actors
Canadian male comedians
Living people
Male actors from Quebec
20th-century Canadian male actors
21st-century Canadian male actors